Alfonso II may refer to:
Alfonso II of Asturias (791–842)
Alfonso II of Aragon (1162–1196)
Alfonso II, Count of Provence (1174–1209)
Afonso II of Portugal (1185–1223), "the Fat"
Alfonso, Count of Poitou (1220–1271), jure uxoris Alfonso II, Count of Toulouse
Alfonso II, Duke of Gandia (–1422)
Alfonso II of Naples (1448–1495)
Alfonso II Piccolomini (1499–1559), Neapolitan nobleman and military leader
Alfonso II d'Este (1533–1597), duke of Ferrara

de:Liste der Herrscher namens Alfons#Alfons II.